Gordon Wallace (born 25 March 1949) is a Scottish former footballer who played as a forward in the Scottish Football League for Raith Rovers, Dundee United, Berwick Rangers and Cowdenbeath.

Playing career
Born in Edinburgh, Gordon Wallace played junior football for Penicuik Athletic before joining Raith Rovers in 1966. After 223 league appearances for Raith scoring 76 goals, he joined Dundee the main team in Dundee, in October 1970 for a reported £12,000 transfer fee. He joined the 2nd team in Dundee in 1976. Blighted by injury he played 15 league games over two seasons scoring 3 goals. His time there was disrupted by injury, with his recovery from a cartilage operation being followed by the discovery of a ligament problem. After recovering, he only played for the reserve team during his second season at the club and was transferred to Berwick Rangers in 1979, where he spent eighteen months 19 league appearances 3 goals. After a short spell at Cowdenbeath 11 league appearances 1 goal he moved to Australia in 1981, where he played for Melbourne club Green Gully.

References

1949 births
Living people
Scottish footballers
Association football forwards
Footballers from Edinburgh
Penicuik Athletic F.C. players
Scottish Junior Football Association players
Raith Rovers F.C. players
Dundee United F.C. players
Berwick Rangers F.C. players
Cowdenbeath F.C. players
Scottish Football League players
Green Gully SC players
Scottish expatriate footballers
Expatriate soccer players in Australia
Scottish expatriate sportspeople in Australia